Multai tehsil is a fourth-order administrative and revenue division, a subdivision of third-order administrative and revenue division of Betul district of Madhya Pradesh.

Geography
Multai tehsil has an area of 807.93 sq kilometers. It is bounded by Athner tehsil in the southwest and west, Betul tehsil in the northwest, Amla tehsil in the north, Chhindwara district in the northeast and east and Maharashtra in the southeast and south.

See also 
Betul district

References

Tehsils of Madhya Pradesh
Betul district